Masuzonoblemus is a genus of beetles in the family Carabidae, containing the following species:

 Masuzonoblemus humeratus Ueno, 1991
 Masuzonoblemus tristis Ueno, 1989

References

Trechinae